During the 2004–05 English football season, Watford competed in the Football League Championship.

Season summary
The 2004–05 season saw a continuation of the good form of the end of the previous season, with the club well in the upper half of the Championship at the end of September. However, a long run of poor form subsequently saw the club drop steadily towards the relegation zone. Another good cup run further eased the club's financial position, with the team reaching the semi-final of the League Cup, soundly beating Premiership sides Portsmouth and Southampton on the way, before losing narrowly to Liverpool. The club's poor league form, however, came to a head in March, with a run of terrible performances and Lewington was sacked on 22 March. His sacking was controversial, and many fans were unhappy at the loss of a man who had led the club to two cup semi-finals in three seasons, enduring considerable financial hardships.

At the age of 34, Aidy Boothroyd was appointed manager of Watford after serving at Leeds United as a coach; 70-year-old Keith Burkinshaw was recruited as his assistant. Boothroyd's inexperience raised concerns among fans, who worried that he would not be able to keep the side in the Championship. However, Watford secured enough points to ensure survival with two games to go in the season.

Final league table

Results
Watford's score comes first

Legend

Football League Championship

FA Cup

League Cup

Players

First-team squad
Squad at end of season

Left club during season

Transfers

In
  Andy Ferrell –  Newcastle United, free
  Jermaine Darlington –  Milton Keynes Dons, free
  James Chambers –  West Bromwich Albion, £250,000

Out
  Paolo Vernazza –  Rotherham United, free
  Wayne Brown –  Colchester United, free
  Micah Hyde –  Burnley, free
  Neal Ardley –  Cardiff City, free
  Scott Fitzgerald –  Brentford, free
  Marcus Gayle –  Brentford, free

References

Notes

Watford F.C. seasons
Watford F.C.